A company register is a register of organizations in the jurisdiction they operate under.

A statistical business register has a different purpose than a company register. While a commercial/trade register serves a purpose of protection, accountability and control, a statistical register plays a central part in a system of official economic statistics at a national statistics office.

Company registers by country 

Each country's company register has different registrar types, contents, purpose, and public availability.

Botswana 
Companies and Intellectual Property Authority is responsible for registering companies in Botswana.

Canada 
The Director General of Corporations Canada is responsible for federally-incorporated corporations.

Each province has a registrar who is responsible for provincially-incorporated corporations.

Czech Republic 
You can apply for the company's entry into the Commercial Register kept by an applicable court. Business companies that have their registered office in Prague and the Central Bohemian Region are registered in the commercial register maintained by the Municipal Court in Prague. If you want to start doing business in the Czech Republic, under the Czech Trade Licensing Act you must submit a trade registration which will issue an extract from the Trade Licensing Register (výpis z živnostenského rejstříku).

United Kingdom

Registrars of Companies 

The Registrar of Companies for England, Wales & Scotland is the official responsible for Companies House, which deals with all filings relating to the Companies Act 1985 to 2006. Companies House ensures that the document filings are kept up to date and deals with any breaches of the Companies Act.

The Registrar of Companies for England & Wales is Louise Smyth, who is based at Companies House, Cardiff.

The Registrar of Companies for Scotland is Lisa Davis, who is based at Companies House, Edinburgh.

The Registrar of Companies for Northern Ireland is Helen Shilliday, whose office is based in Belfast.

Registrar of Mutuals 

The Financial Conduct Authority is responsible for the maintenance of the Mutuals Public Register of co-operative societies, building societies, friendly societies, credit unions and other registered mutuals, and deals with all the filings related to the Co-operative and Community Benefit Societies Act 2014 and other relevant legislation. 

The registration of registered societies and credit unions in Northern Ireland was transferred to the Financial Conduct Authority in 2018.

Jersey 
The Registrar of Companies for Jersey is the Jersey Financial Services Commission.

India 

India has one registrar of companies for each of the below regions. Each state typically has one registrar office or shares an office with neighbouring states and/or union territories. Maharashtra and Tamil Nadu are the only states to have two offices and two registrar of companies. Puducherry is the only union territory to have its own office.

Ireland

Registrar of Companies 

The Registrar of Companies is the official responsible for the Companies Registration Office (Ireland), which deals with all filings relating to the Companies Act 2014, as amended, in addition to the registration of business names and limited partnerships,  in Ireland.

The Companies Registration Office ensures that the document filings are kept up to date and deals with most administrative breaches of the Companies Act.

More serious breaches of the Companies Act are investigated and enforced by the Corporate Enforcement Authority.

Registrar of Societies 

The Registrar of Friendly Societies is the official responsible for the registration of industrial and provident societies (the vast majority of which are co-operatives and friendly societies in Ireland.

The Registrar deals with all filings related to the industrial and provident society, and friendly society legislation, and deals with most administrative breaches of the Acts.

Registrar of Credit Unions and Building Societies 

The Central Bank of Ireland is the official responsible for the registration of credit unions (Registrar of Credit Unions) and building societies in Ireland.

Openness 

According to ratings published by the website OpenCorporates, Denmark and United Kingdom are the leaders with regard to openness of information available in a company's register. Registries/registrars in these countries are named, correspondingly, Central Business Register and Companies House.

See also 

 List of company registers
 Corporate Registers Forum

References 

Corporate law